Azatavan is a village in the Artashat Municipality of the Ararat Province of Armenia.

References 

World Gazeteer: Armenia – World-Gazetteer.com
Report of the results of the 2001 Armenian Census

Populated places in Ararat Province
Erivan Governorate